Cnemaspis boulengerii, also known commonly as Boulenger's rock gecko or the Con Dao round eyed gecko, is a species of lizard in the family Gekkonidae. The species is endemic to Côn Sơn Island (also called Pulo Condore) in southern Vietnam.

Etymology
The specific name, boulengerii, is in honor of Belgian-born British herpetologist George Albert Boulenger.

Habitat
The preferred natural habitats of C. boulengerii are forest, rocky areas, and caves.

Description
Dorsally, C. boulengerii is tan, with a few large roundish black spots on the shoulders and nape. Ventrally it is grayish white. The tail is about 10% longer than SVL.

Reproduction
C. boulengerii is oviparous.

References

Further reading
Rösler H (2000). "Kommentierte Liste der rezent, subrezent und fossil bekannten Geckotaxa (Reptilia: Gekkonomorpha)". Gekkota 2: 28–153. (Cnemaspis boulengerii, p. 62). (in German).
Smith MA (1921). "Reptiles and Batrachians collected on Pulo Condore".  Journal of the Natural History Socierty of Siam 4: 93–97 + one plate. (Gonatodes glaucus, new species, pp. 95–96 + plate, figures 3 & 3a).
Smith MA (1935). The Fauna of British India, Including Ceylon and Burma. Reptilia and Amphibia. Vol. II.—Sauria. London: Secretary of State for India in Council. (Taylor & Francis, printers). xiii + 440 pp. + Plate I + two maps. ("Cnemaspis boulengeri [sic]", pp. 76–77).
Strauch A (1887). "Bemerkungen über die Geckoniden-Sammlung im zoologischen Museum der kaiserlichen Akademie der Wissenschaften zu St. Petersburg ". Mémoires de l'Academie Impériale des Sciences de St-Pétersbourg, Septième Série 35 (2): 1–72 + index + one plate. (Cnemaspis boulengerii, new species, pp. 42–43 + plate, figures 7–9). (in German).

Cnemaspis
Reptiles described in 1887